Vaikom Narayani Janaki (30 November 192319 May 1996), also known as Janaki Ramachandran, was an Indian politician, actress and activist who served as the chief minister of Tamil Nadu for 23 days after the death of her husband M. G. Ramachandran, former chief minister of Tamil Nadu. She was the first woman to become the chief minister of Tamil Nadu. She was also the first actress to become the chief minister  in the history of India.

Background
Janaki was born in the town of Vaikom in Kottayam district of Travancore  into a family with ties to both Tamil Nadu and Kerala.  Her father, Rajagopal Iyer, was a Tamil Brahmin hailing from Thanjavur in Tamil Nadu, and was the brother of Papanasam Sivan, the musician and composer. Her mother, Narayani Amma, belonged to Vaikom and was of a Keralite matrilineal caste. She married actor Ganapathy Bhat (1915–1972) in 1939, and had a son named Surendran.

Film career
Janaki's early films were Manmatha Vijayam (1939) and Savithri(1941). Chandralekha in 1948 brought her popularity.

Janaki acted with Ramachandran in films like Raja Mukthi and Mohini. She continued acting, with films like Velaikaari and Marudhanaattu Ilavarasi in the 1950s but had stopped by 1960. Following the death of Ramachandran's second wife, she moved in with him. They legally married in 1962.Ramachandran, who was childless in his three marriages, is said to have taken an affectionate interest in the well-being of Surendran, her son from her first marriage.

Political career
Janaki was not politically active during Ramachandran's life with only a handful of public appearances in AIADMK's early days. Ramachandran groomed other young leaders of his party for political responsibility, including the actress Jayalalithaa, with whom he was said to share a great professional rapport.

When Ramachandran suffered a paralytic stroke in 1984, she became the intermediary between him and the party.
Due to his death in 1987, Janaki was asked by party members to take his place.

Chief Minister, 1988

In deference to their wishes, she became Chief minister in January 1988. Her government lasted only 24 days, the shortest in the history of Tamil Nadu. 

Her ministry went for a sensitive vote of confidence of the Eighth Tamil Nadu Legislative Assembly in January 1988.  This was because AIADMK coalition with 194 MLAs had split into 3 factions, with one group of 30 MLAs supporting Jayalalitha and another group of 101 MLAs supporting Janaki. The Congress party, under the directive of its national chief and then PM Rajiv Gandhi, had decided to vote neutral. The opposition demanded secret ballot in the assembly, on the day of vote. But the speaker, who supported Janaki, rejected this. He had already disqualified the 30 MLAs of Jayalalitha faction and 15 MLAs of DMK the previous day. He had also decreed that the support of MLAs physically present in the assembly at the time of vote was sufficient. So instead of proving majority in 234 with just 101, Janaki had to prove majority in 198. When the speaker called for vote, DMK and AIADMK MLAs clashed in assembly and many were injured including the speaker. On speaker's request, the CM called police into the house. The speaker announced unilaterally that the cabinet had won motion of confidence.

The central government under Rajiv Gandhi used Article 356 of the Constitution of India to dismiss her government in February. Her party was subsequently defeated in the next elections that were held in 1989. She quit politics after the unification of the two factions of the AIADMK. Janaki is one of the few chief ministers to have not won any legislative elections.

Death
She died of a cardiac arrest on 19 May 1996. She was buried beside her residence at MGR Thottam in Raamapuram, Chennai, Tamil Nadu.

Legacy
VN Janaki  gifted her property in Avvai Shanmugham Salai (Lloyds Road) in honour of her husband to the AIADMK. It subsequently became the headquarters of the party in 1986. She was the founder chairman of The Satya Educational & Charitable Society managing many free educational institutions in Chennai. She gave property worth many million of dollars for the establishment of educational and charitable institutions in Tamil Nadu. She was also instrumental in setting up the Janaki Ramachandran Educational & Charitable Trust.

Filmography 
This is a partial filmography. You can expand it.

1930s

1940s

1950s

1960s

See also
 Kollywood
 Chennai
 V. N. Janaki ministry
 Dr.MGR Janaki College of Arts and Science for Women
 Dr.MGR Home and Higher Secondary School for the Speech and Hearing Impaired

Notes

References

External links

 Dr.MGR Home & Higher Secondary School for the Speech & Hearing Impaired

1924 births
1996 deaths
Chief Ministers of Tamil Nadu
Tamil Nadu politicians
Actresses in Tamil cinema
Indian actor-politicians
20th-century Indian actresses
Women chief ministers of Indian states
Actresses from Kottayam
Women in Tamil Nadu politics
Chief ministers from All India Anna Dravida Munnetra Kazhagam
Politicians from Kottayam
20th-century Indian women politicians
20th-century Indian politicians
Women of the Kingdom of Travancore
People of the Kingdom of Travancore
People from Vaikom
Actresses in Malayalam cinema